Tescalsia is a genus of moths in the family Geometridae first described by Alexander Douglas Campbell Ferguson in 1994.

Species
Tescalsia giulianiata Ferguson, 1994
Tescalsia minata Ferguson, 1994

References

Operophterini